The 1984 Sriharikota cyclone, officially named Tropical Cyclone 03B, was the worst to hit the central east coast of India in 15 years. It brought intense flooding in the Indian state of Andhra Pradesh and Tamil Nadu, resulting in 604 fatalities. The short-lived storm was the second and most powerful of the 1984 North Indian Ocean cyclone season.

Background
In 1984, the North Indian Ocean saw two uneventful cyclones prior to November 9. Tropical Cyclone OIA formed in late May, which developed over the western Arabian Sea. This storm tracked west-southwest and into the Gulf of Aden. Cyclone OIA is the first documented and one of a few tropical cyclones to transit the Gulf of Aden since space satellites began tracking in 1966. There were no casualties or damage.

On October 12, Tropical Cyclone 02B developed in the north-central Bay of Bengal. Due to the presence of Tropical Storm Susan in the South China Sea, it could not develop into a stronger storm. It followed a north–northwest path. Heavy rains were reported but the storm did not cause damage.

Meteorological history

Tropical Cyclone 03B developed as a low-pressure area over the south-central Bay of Bengal on the morning of November 9. The storm intensified into a deep depression in the evening. It followed a west-northwestward path, becoming a tropical storm on November 10 and a cyclone on 11th. By the evening, it had become a severe cyclonic storm. A break in the ridge brought it northward, where steering currents collapsed on 13th. The storm traveled north on the 12th, where a -wide eye was observed via satellite. The storm maintained a mostly stationary position during the 13th. It gradually dissipated on the 15th.

Impact
The cyclone's intensification, stall and erratic movements occurred very close to the coast, which resulted in prolonged torrential rain and flood. A total of 604 people died. Flooding affected a large area of Andhra Pradesh and Tamil Nadu. Nearly 1,00,000 livestock were killed and 400,000 houses were destroyed in Andhra Pradesh. A  surge was recorded near Gudur. In nearby Tamil Nadu, the storm brought moderate damage and killed 54 people.

In Andhra Pradesh, over 200 villages were submerged by floodwaters. Thousands of trees were uprooted. Roads and bridges were damaged while rail and electrical services were disrupted. More than 70 villages around Pulicat Lake area were submerged under  of water. The rough surges drowned several hundred cattle and 37 residents. There were unconfirmed reports that a village at the shore was buried along with its residents by large amounts of sand.

Seventeen people died in Chennai, and 60,000 individuals who lived in huts became homeless. The cyclone was described as the worst since 1977 in the Nellore district. More than 270 people died before rescuers from the Indian army arrived. Another 150,000 were made homeless. Villages and its residents in northern Tamil Nadu and the south Andhra Pradesh coast were left in extreme conditions. A survivor recalled having to cling onto a tree for two days to escape the water.

Response
Six satellites were operating during the duration of the storm which provided warning to the area. This was in response to the 1977 cyclone, hence the death toll was lower this time. Many AIADMK ministers from Tamil Nadu had moved to New Delhi to attend to electoral matters with the Congress when the cyclone struck. Officials, food and other emergency supplies were rushed to four districts, including Nellore prior to the cyclone's arrival. Rescue operstions took place as soon as the storm subsided.

After the disaster, Prime Minister Rajiv Gandhi ordered an assessment team to evaluate the damage in the affected states. N. T. Rama Rao and Prime Minister Gandhi participated in an aerial survey of the area. Prime Minister Gandhi later allocated ₹100 million for relief efforts.

References

Further reading

1984 North Indian Ocean cyclone season
Tropical cyclones in 1984
1984 in India
Tropical cyclones in India
History of Andhra Pradesh (1947–2014)
History of Tamil Nadu (1947–present)
Satish Dhawan Space Centre